Serena Mary Strathearn Gordon (born 3 September 1963) is an English actress. Her roles include Amanda Prosser in police drama The Bill and MI6 evaluator Caroline in 1995 James Bond film GoldenEye.

Life and career

Born in London, she is the daughter of property consultant Ian Strathearn Gordon, of 19 Campden Grove, London W8, and magistrate Nicola Mary, daughter of Major Nicholas Norman Norman-Butler, of Cardfields, Hatfield Peverel, Essex. Ian Gordon's great-grandfather was the Scottish judge and politician Edward Strathearn Gordon, Baron Gordon of Drumearn; the Norman-Butler family were landed gentry, of Bourton House, Berkshire, related to the Lubbock baronets, later created Barons Avebury.

Gordon studied at RADA in the same year as Jane Horrocks, where the two became best friends. After college they shared a flat in Bayswater and celebrated their joint 30th birthday party at the Groucho Club.

Gordon separated from her husband, Tim Laurence in 2011. Together they still run the UK branch of the Hoffman Institute, which runs a personal development programme founded by Bob Hoffman in 1967. They have two sons, Ben and Alfie.

Filmography

References

External links
 

1963 births
Living people
Alumni of RADA
English film actresses
English television actresses
Actresses from London
20th-century English actresses
21st-century English actresses